The Hanafi Mosque of Bourguiba is a Tunisian Hanafi mosque located in Monastir and dedicated to the first president of Tunisia, Habib Bourguiba.

History 
The mosque was built in 1963 by Taieb Bouzguenda.

Architecture 
The mosque is designed in a traditional architecture based on that of the Hammouda Pacha Mosque of Tunis. The prayer hall can accommodate up to a thousand people. It mihrab, located in a semi-dome, is covered with a half arch decorated with a golden mosaic. The columns' bows are made of pink marble.

See also 

 List of mosques in Tunisia

Gallery

External links

References 

Mosques in Tunisia